Brachymystax lenok, the sharp-snouted lenok, is a salmonid fish distributed in rivers and lakes in northeastern Asia. It formerly included the blunt-snouted lenok, but recent authorities typically treat the latter as a separate species, B. tumensis, based on differences in morphology and genetics.

As presently defined, the sharp-snouted lenok is widespread in central and eastern Russia, and also found widely in northern Mongolia, locally in northeastern Kazakhstan (Irtysh Basin) and northeastern China (Amur Basin). The blunt-snouted lenok (B. tumensis) is found widely in southeastern Russia and more locally in northeastern and central parts of the country, as well as northeastern Mongolia (Amur Basin), northern China and Korea. Although the two generally are found in separate areas, there are also regions where their ranges overlap such as the Amur Basin.

The sharp-snouted lenok is widespread overall, but some populations, especially in China, have declined due to overexploitation and pollution.

References

lenok
Fish of Asia
Fish described in 1773
Taxa named by Peter Simon Pallas